Single Valentine is a 2013 Lithuanian comedy film directed by Donatas Ulvydas.

External links 

2013 comedy films
2013 films
Lithuanian comedy films